The Black River is a river in northern Cochrane District in Northwestern Ontario, Canada. It is part of the James Bay drainage basin, and is a right tributary of the Bodell River.

The river begins at an unnamed lake and flows north to its mouth at the Bodell River. The Bodell River flows via the Kesagami River and the Harricana River to James Bay.

See also
List of rivers of Ontario

References

Other map sources:

Rivers of Cochrane District